The Hargrave River is a river in the Hudson Bay drainage basin in Northern Manitoba, Canada. It flows in a southeasterly direction from its source at Hargrave Lake to Hill Lake on the Minago River, which flows into Cross Lake on the Nelson River.

Tributaries include Fenton Creek and Huzyk Creek, which flow in from the west.

See also
List of rivers of Manitoba

References

Rivers of Northern Manitoba
Tributaries of Hudson Bay